Otto Zitko (born in Linz on 14 February 1959) is an Austrian artist who lives and works in Vienna.

Exhibitions (Selection since 2000) 
 2010 Me, Myself and I – Otto Zitko and Louise Bourgeois, Arnolfini, Bristol
getting hot, Krobath, Berlin
 2009 Die Kunst ist super!, Hamburger Bahnhof – Museum für Gegenwart, Berlin
 2008 espacio marte, México City
 2007 Galerie Elisabeth & Klaus Thoman, Innsbruck
Magic Line, MUSEION – Museum of Modern and Contemporary Art, Bolzano
Museum of Contemporary Art, Leipzig (GfZK)
 2006 Galería Heinrich Ehrhardt, Madrid (with Herbert Brandl)
Galerie Krobath Wimmer, Vienna
Soleil Noir. Depression and Society, Salzburger Kunstverein, Salzburg
Bunkier Sztuki, Contemporary Art Gallery, Krakow
 2005 Museum of Contemporary Art KIASMA, Helsinki
China retour, MUMOK, Museum Moderner Kunst Stiftung Ludwig Wien, Vienna
 2004 Austrian Cultural Forum Prague
The Moravian Gallery Brno (with Josef Dabernig)
 2003 Cheim & Read, New York
Franz West Vis-à-Vis Otto Zitko, Tim Van Laere Gallery, Antwerp (with Franz West)
© EUROPE EXISTS, MMCA, Macedonian Museum of Contemporary Art, Thessaloniki
Galerie Elisabeth & Klaus Thoman, Innsbruck
 2002 Galerie de l’École des Beaux-Arts, Caen
Uncommon Denominator, MASS MoCA, Massachusetts Museum of Contemporary Art, North Adams, MA
Galería Heinrich Ehrhardt, Madrid
 2001 International Contemporary Art, Museo de Arte Moderno / Museum of Modern Art, Mexico City
 2000 Cheim & Read, New York
Galerie Krobath Wimmer, Vienna

Bibliography 
Pythia. Edition Antagon #2, Salzburg 2008.Text: Hemma Schmutz
The Construction of Gesture. Eds. Hemma Schmutz, Salzburger Kunstverein, Salzburg / Barbara Steiner, GfZK Galerie für Zeitgenössische Kunst Leipzig / Ingeburg Wurzer, Atelier Otto Zitko, Wien, Berlin 2008. Text: Jan Avgikos, Hemma Schmutz, Andreas Spiegl, Barbara Steiner
Räume. Kunsthalle Bern, 1996. Text: Ulrich Loock, Christian Kravagna
Otto Zitko. Cheim & Read, New York, Vienna 2000. Text: Herbert Lachmayer

External links 
Otto Zitko's homepage
 Cheim & Read, New York
 Krobath, Vienna / Berlin
 Galerie Elisabeth & Klaus Thoman, Innsbruck
 Galería Heinrich Ehrhardt, Madrid

Artists from Linz
1959 births
Living people